Adrien Ouellette is a Canadian politician. He was a Parti Québécois member of the National Assembly of Quebec from 1976 to 1985, representing the riding of Beauce-Nord.

Prior to his election to the legislature, Ouellette served for eight years as mayor of Saint-Joseph-de-Beauce. He was appointed to the Order of Canada in 1973.

References

 

1940 births
Living people
Parti Québécois MNAs
Members of the Order of Canada
Mayors of places in Quebec
People from Beauce, Quebec